The Corsican Brothers is a 1961 French-Italian historical action film directed by Anton Giulio Majano and starring Geoffrey Horne, Valérie Lagrange and Gérard Barray. It is also known as Lions of Corsica. The film is an adaptation of the 1844 story The Corsican Brothers by Alexandre Dumas. The film was shot in Eastmancolor.

Synopsis 
The Franchi twins, when baptized, were separated when their family was murdered by his enemies, the Sagona. While one brother went into the maquis for revenge, the other, unaware of the family drama, became a doctor and struck up a friendship with a descendant of the Sagona. But blood ties and their love for the same woman will bring them together...

Cast
 Geoffrey Horne as Paolo Franchi / Leone Franchi
 Valérie Lagrange as Edith
 Gérard Barray as Giovanni Sagona
 Mario Feliciani as Dr. Dupont
 Emma Danieli as Gabrielle De Roux
 Jean Servais as Gerolamo Sagona
 Amedeo Nazzari as Orlandi
 Nerio Bernardi as Prof. Perrier
 Alberto Farnese as Gaspare
 Raoul Grassilli as Raul Sagona
 Franco Graziosi as Domenico
 Germano Longo as Claudio Franchi
 Sandro Moretti as Claudio
 Lucilla Morlacchi
 Paola Patrizi as Mariella
 Aldo Pini as Morny
 Laura Solari as Luisa Dupont
 Nando Tamberlani as Count Franchi
 Luigi Vannucchi as Luigi Sagona
 Lia Zoppelli as Aunt Mary

References

External links
 
 The Corsican Brothers at Variety Distribution

1961 films
French historical adventure films
Italian historical adventure films
1960s historical adventure films
1950s Italian-language films
Films directed by Anton Giulio Majano
Films based on The Corsican Brothers
Films set in Corsica
Films set in the 19th century
Films scored by Angelo Francesco Lavagnino
1950s Italian films
1960s Italian films
1950s French films
1960s French films